Frenchmans Creek is a  stream in San Mateo County, California. Locks Creek is its largest tributary.

See also
List of watercourses in the San Francisco Bay Area

References

Rivers of San Mateo County, California
Rivers of Northern California